Karl Magnus Ehrencrona (born 1978) is a Swedish politician and former member of the Riksdag, the national legislature. A member of the Green Party, he represented Skåne County West between October 2010 and September 2014.

References

1978 births
Living people
Members of the Riksdag 2010–2014
Members of the Riksdag from the Green Party